Iblin, also spelled Ibleen, is a village in the Arihah District in the Idlib Governorate in Syria. It is located in the Zawiya Mountain. According to the Syria Central Bureau of Statistics (CBS), Iblin had a population of 2,949 in the 2004 census.

Syrian Civil War

During the Syrian Civil War, the village became occupied by Tahrir al-Sham (HTS), a Jihadist opposition faction. After the Syrian Army's 'Dawn of Idlib 2' campaign in 2020, the village became situated near the frontline of fighting in the area.

On 10 June 2021, 4 civilians and 9 Tahrir al-Sham fighters were killed in a Syrian army rocket attack on the village. The spokesperson of the military wing of HTS, Abu Khaled al-Shamy and the media coordinator in the HTS military media department, Abu Mosa’ab were both killed.

References

Populated places in Ariha District
Villages in Idlib Governorate